The Health Service Medical Supplies (Costs) Act 2017 (c. 23) is an Act of the Parliament of the United Kingdom.

It provides that pharmaceutical companies can be compelled to reduce the price of a generic medicine or introduce other controls on branded products in cases where charges are “unreasonable”.

References
Halsbury's Statutes,

External links

United Kingdom Acts of Parliament 2017
NHS legislation